Hafsteinn Gunnar Sigurðsson (born ) is an Icelandic film director and screenwriter.

Filmography 

 Skröltormar (2007) (Short)
 Paradox (2011) (Documentary)
 Either Way (Á annan veg) (2011)
 Filma (2012) (Documentary)
  (2014)
 Under the Tree (Undir trénu) (2017) 
 Last Call (Síðasta áminningin) (2018) (Documentary) 
 Northern Comfort (2023)

References

External links 

 Hafsteinn Gunnar Sigurðsson at the Icelandic Film Centre
 

1978 births
Hafsteinn Gunnar Sigurðsson
Hafsteinn Gunnar Sigurðsson
Living people